The 2016–17 Coppa Titano was the 59th season of the competition. The tournament began on 13 September 2016 and ended on 26 April 2017.

The winner of the cup (S. P. Tre Penne) qualified for the Europa League.

Format
The fifteen clubs from San Marino were drawn into four groups. The winners and runners-up from each group advanced to the knockout stage.

Group stage
The clubs played six matches against the other clubs in their group. In groups A, B, and C the clubs played each other twice. In group D the clubs played each other three times.

Group A

Group B

Group C

Group D

Matches 1–4

Matches 5–6

Knockout stage
The draw for the knockout stage was held 21 March 2017.

Quarter-final

Semi-final

Final

References

External links
 official site (Italian)
 uefa.com

Coppa Titano seasons
San Marino
Coppa Titano